Galleh Kola (also Romanized as Galleh Kolā) is a village in Feyziyeh Rural District, in the Central District of Babol County, Mazandaran Province, Iran. At the 2006 census, its population was 542, in 134 families.

References 

Populated places in Babol County